Onchocerca is a genus of parasitic roundworm. It contains one human parasite – Onchocerca volvulus – which is responsible for the neglected disease Onchocerciasis, also known as "river blindness" because the infected humans tend to live near rivers where host black flies live. Over 40 million people are infected in Africa, Central America, and South America. Other species affect cattle, horses, etc.

List of species

Onchocerca armillata
Onchocerca cervicalis
Onchocerca dukei
Onchocerca fasciata
Onchocerca flexuosa
Onchocerca gibsoni
Onchocerca gutturosa
Onchocerca jakutensis
Onchocerca linealis
Onchocerca lupi
Onchocerca ochengi
Onchocerca ramachandrini
Onchocerca tubingensis
Onchocerca volvulus

References 

Parasitic nematodes of mammals
Spirurida
Secernentea genera